Future Racer is a PlayStation video game released in Europe in 2001 and in Japan on May 23, 1997 as Defeat Lightning.

See also
List of PlayStation games

References

PlayStation (console) games
Video games developed in Japan